Robert R. Weber (November 19, 1925 – September 24, 2021) was an American politician in the state of South Dakota. He was a member of the South Dakota House of Representatives from 1973 to 2000. He was a farmer and former chairman of his local school board. Weber died on September 24, 2021.

References

1925 births
2021 deaths
Farmers from South Dakota
South Dakota Republicans
People from Watertown, South Dakota